Cutaneous meningioma (also known as "Heterotopic meningeal tissue," and "Rudimentary meningocele") is a developmental defect, and results from the presence of meningocytes outside the calvarium.

See also
 List of cutaneous conditions

References

Dermal and subcutaneous growths